In general relativity, the peeling theorem describes the asymptotic behavior of the Weyl tensor as one goes to null infinity. Let  be a null geodesic in a spacetime  from a point p to null infinity, with affine parameter . Then the theorem states that, as  tends to infinity:

where  is the Weyl tensor, and we used the abstract index notation.

References

External links

General relativity
Theorems in general relativity